Patrick Ryan (born 1995) is an Irish hurler who plays as a Full Forward for club side Doon and at inter-county level with the Limerick senior hurling team.

Playing career

University

During his studies at the University of Limerick, Ryan was selected for the college's senior hurling team. On 24 February 2018, he won a Fitzgibbon Cup medal following UL's 2-21 to 2-15 defeat of Dublin City University in the final.

Club

Ryan joined the Doon club at a young age and played in all grades at juvenile and underage levels, enjoying championship success in under-12, under-14 and under-15 grades. As a member of the club's minor team, he won back-to-back championship medals in 2012 and 2013 following respective defeats of Patrickswell and Na Piarsaigh. Ryan later made his senior championship debut for the club.

Inter-county

Minor and under-21

Ryan first played for Limerick at minor level in 2012, in a season which ended with a defeat by Clare in the Munster Championship semi-final.

Ryan joined the Limerick under-21 hurling team in 2014. In his second season he won a Munster Championship medal after a 0-22 to 0-19 win over Clare in the final. On 12 September 2015, Ryan was at midfield when Limerick defeated Wexford by 0-26 to 1-07 in the All-Ireland final. He ended the season by being named on the Bord Gáis Energy Team of the Year.

Senior

On 12 February 2017, Ryan made his first appearance for the Limerick senior team in a 1-14 to 0-14 National Hurling League defeat by Wexford.

On 19 August 2018, Ryan was a non-playing substitute when Limerick won their first All-Ireland title in 45 years after a 3-16 to 2-18 defeat of Galway in the final.

On 30 June 2019, Ryan won a Munster Championship medal as a non-playing substitute following Limerick's 2-26 to 2-14 defeat of Tipperary in the final.

Career statistics

Honours

Mary Immaculate College
Fitzgibbon Cup (1): 2018

Doon
Limerick Minor Hurling Championship (2): 2012, 2013

Limerick
All-Ireland Senior Hurling Championship (2): 2018, 2020
Munster Senior Hurling Championship (3): 2019, 2020, 2021
National Hurling League (2): 2019, 2020
All-Ireland Under-21 Hurling Championship (1): 2015
Munster Under-21 Hurling Championship (1): 2015
Munster Minor Hurling Championship (1): 2013

References

1995 births
Living people
Doon hurlers
Limerick inter-county hurlers